Blah...Blah...Blah...Love Songs for the New Millennium is the first album by heavy metal band Scum of the Earth.

Track listing
 "I Am the Scum" – 3:16
 "Bloodsukinfreakshow" – 2:33
 "Get Your Dead On" – 3:56
 "Little Spider" – 3:48
 "Murder Song" – 3:17
 "AltarGirl 13" – 3:41
 "Pornstar Champion" (Remix of the Queen song "We Will Rock You") – 3:57
 "Nothing Girl" – 3:12
 "The Devil Made Me Do It" – 3:09
 "Give Up Your Ghost" – 4:39
 "Beneath the Living" – 2:11

Personnel
 Tom Baker - Mastering
 Brian Belski - Mixing
 Daniel Brereton - Art direction
 Clay Campbell - Bass
 Dave Cook - Art direction
 John Dolmayan  - Drums
 Frank Gryner - Mixing
 Roxanna Jacobson - Violin
 Mike Riggs - Vocals, guitar, producer
 John Tempesta - Drums, percussion, vocals
 Mike Tempesta - Guitar

References

2004 debut albums
Scum of the Earth (band) albums